Telford Lake is a lake in Leduc, Alberta.It is home to boat races and many other events.

History
Around 1890, Robert Telford, a politician from Quebec, bought a plot of land near the lake. The lake was later named for him.

Wildlife
There are many species of wildlife in the Telford Lake riverbanks. Conservation projects are numerous in Telford Lake.

External links

References

Lakes of Alberta